Émile Lucien Lafourcade-Cortina (4 January 1864 – 22 August 1904) was a French fencer. He competed in the men's sabre event at the 1900 Summer Olympics.

References

External links
 

1864 births
1904 deaths
French female sabre fencers
Olympic fencers of France
Fencers at the 1900 Summer Olympics
Sportspeople from Pyrénées-Atlantiques